The National Organization of Black Law Enforcement Executives (NOBLE) is a membership group of primarily black law enforcement CEOs and command level officials in local, state, county, and federal government. Headquartered in Washington, DC, it has 57 chapters in the United States, one in St. Kitts & Nevis and one in the United Kingdom.

Goals
The goal of NOBLE is to be recognized as a highly competent public service organization that is at the forefront of providing solutions to law enforcement issues and concerns, as well as to the ever-changing needs of African-American communities.

History
The organization was founded in 1976, during a three-day symposium to address crime in urban low income areas. The symposium was attended by 60 top-ranking black law enforcement executives from 24 states and 55 major cities. They exchanged views about the high rate of crime in black urban communities and the socioeconomic conditions that lead to crime and violence, as well as relevant issues such as fairness in the administration of justice (or the lack thereof), strained police/community relations, the hiring and promotion of black police officers, and the unique problems faced by black police executives and black police officers in general.
Recognizing that black law enforcement executives could more effectively impact the criminal justice system through a unified voice, the symposium participants departed from the planned agenda to create NOBLE.
One of the original founders of NOBLE was former NYPD Chief of Patrol William R. Bracey.

Notable members

 Dr. Theron L. Bowman, CALEA Board of Commissioners
 Mr. Thomas H. Warren, Sr., CALEA Board of Commissioners
 Cedric Alexander, former president of the NOBLE
 Rodney Bryant, Sergeant-At-Arms

See also

Law enforcement in the United States
Commission on Accreditation for Law Enforcement Agencies

References

External links
 
About NOBLE
NOBLE headquarters home page

African-American law enforcement organizations
Organizations established in 1976
Organizations based in Washington, D.C.
1976 establishments in the United States